"Secret Secret" (シークレットシークレット Shīkuretto Shīkuretto) is a song by Japanese electropop unit Perfume. The song is the 9th song of their 2nd album GAME.

Composition
Secret Secret is 4 minutes and 57 seconds long, an uptempo electro house. It starts with a subdominant major 7th chord, and is believed to be in the key of C# minor.

Music video

Background
The music video of Secret Secret was directed by Yuichi Kodama. The video shares the same concept with the ads for Janpnese long-seller icecream called "Pino" from Morinaga Milk Industry. The video and ads were produced by MTV Japan with the cooperation of Morinaga Milk Industry.

The advertising slogan is "ながらピノ、する？" (Nagara Pino, suru?; lit. Shall we eat Pino while doing something?)

The ads were aired on TV since April 10, 2008, and on the same day the video also was released on the MTV Japan channel and a special page of MTV Japan website "MTV meets PTV". Since 25 April 2008, the making-of processes of the video were repeatedly broadcast on the channel.

Synopsis

The video starts with the logo "PTV" (Pino TV), a fictional TV station, which parodies MTV. At first, the three Mannequins which look like the three members stand on the stage. Once the assistants have them eat a Pino piece, they suddenly began to dance.
At first they wear grey-based uniform, and dance on the plain stage. On the next part they dance with the clothes of their 3rd major Electro World on, and partly feature the dance of the 2nd major single Computer City.
On the last part, the group finally got famous, and on the introduction by a blonde mushroom-haired host(played by Utamaru (宇多丸)), dance in a gorgeous dress on the music program, but with a sad smile. At the end, the three performers turn back into Mannequins again, and metafictionally the members come from the back stage and joyfully eat Pino with the Mannequins behind.
Kodama states that he would like to express both their joy and sadness to have been big stars.

References

External links 
 Perfume「シークレットシークレット」"Secret Secret" on YouTube Perfume official channel

2008 songs
Perfume (Japanese band) songs
Songs written by Yasutaka Nakata
Song recordings produced by Yasutaka Nakata
Retrofuturism